The rufous-breasted spinetail (Synallaxis erythrothorax) is a species of bird in the family Furnariidae. It is found in Belize, El Salvador, Guatemala, Honduras, and Mexico. Its natural habitats are subtropical or tropical moist lowland forests and heavily degraded former forest.

References

Further reading

rufous-breasted spinetail
Birds of Mexico
Birds of the Yucatán Peninsula
Birds of Belize
Birds of Guatemala
Birds of El Salvador
Birds of Honduras
rufous-breasted spinetail
rufous-breasted spinetail
Taxonomy articles created by Polbot